Justin Wieck is an American college basketball coach, currently head coach for the Minnesota Duluth Bulldogs.

A native of North Liberty, Iowa, Wieck attended Kirkwood Community College from 2002 to 2004, where he played basketball and earned a Bachelor's degree in finance. In 2004, he transferred to the University of Iowa where he was on the All-Academic Big 10 team. He graduated with a Master's degree in athletic administration. After graduating, Wieck served as a graduate assistant for Iowa from 2006-08, then he was hired as an assistant and served as Iowa's video coordinator. In 2010, he left his alma mater to serve as an assistant coach at Northern State University under head coach Paul Sather from 2010-12. During his two seasons with the Wolves, they went 25-28. In 2012, Wieck was hired as the head coach for the Jamestown Jimmies. During his two years there, the Jimmies went 25-38, winning one NSAA regular season championship and one NSAA tournament championship during the 2013-14 season. During the 2012-13 season, several games were forfeited due to an ineligible player. Wieck was named the NSAA coach of the year in 2014. In 2014, Wieck left Jamestown to serve as an assistant coach at Minnesota State University Moorhead. During his four years there, the Dragons achieved a record of 96-38 and won two NSIC regular season championships, and made three NCAA tournament appearances. 

In 2018, Wieck left MSU-Moorhead to become the head coach for the Minnesota Duluth Bulldogs. Over the last two years, he has achieved a record of 39-19.

He has a wife named Laura, a son named Jordy, and two daughters named Anya and Ella.

Head coaching record

**-several games were forfeited due to an ineligible player

References

Year of birth missing (living people)
Living people
American men's basketball coaches
American men's basketball players
Basketball coaches from Iowa
College men's basketball head coaches in the United States
Iowa Hawkeyes men's basketball coaches
Iowa Hawkeyes men's basketball players
Jamestown Jimmies men's basketball coaches
Junior college men's basketball players in the United States
Kirkwood Community College alumni
Minnesota Duluth Bulldogs men's basketball coaches
Minnesota State–Moorhead Dragons men's basketball coaches
Northern State Wolves men's basketball coaches